Farhad Ghaemian (was born 1965 in Ardabil) is an Iranian theater and cinema actor.

See also
 Bodyguard
 Hussein Who Said No
 Nardebam-e Aseman
 Misunderstanding of a dream
Gando (TV series)
 The Recall
 Flying Passion
 Predicament

References

External links
 

1965 births
Living people
People from Ardabil
Iranian male film actors
Iranian male stage actors
Iranian male television actors